Scotti is a surname of Italian origin. Notable persons with that surname include:
Andrea Scotti (born 1931), Italian film and television actor
Andrés Scotti (born 1975), Uruguayan football (soccer) player
Antonio Scotti (1866–1936), Italian operatic baritone
Ben Scotti (born 1937), American football (American football) player
Carlo Scotti (born 1904), Italian boxer
Diego Scotti (born 1977), Uruguayan football (soccer) player
Francesco Scotti (born 1983), Italian footballer
Friedrich von Scotti (1889-1969), general of Nazi Germany during World War II
Gianbernardino Scotti (died 1568), Italian Roman Catholic bishop and cardinal
Gian Giacomo Gallarati Scotti (1886-1983), Italian politician, 5th podestà of Milan
Giovanni Scotti (1911-1992), Italian ice hockey player
Gottardo Scotti (1447-1481), Italian painter of the Renaissance period
James V. Scotti (born 1960), American astronomer
Lemmo Rossi-Scotti, count (1848-1926), Italian late-Romantic painter, mainly of battle scenes
Luigi Scotti (born 1932), Italian judge and minister of justice
Michael Scotti (born 1963), American football (American football) player
Mike Scotti, former U.S. Marine and author 
Mikhail Scotti (1812–1861), Russian painter
Nick Scotti (born 1966), American actor and singer
Ottavio Scotti (1904-1975), Italian art director
Pasquale Scotti (born 1958), Italian criminal and boss of the Camorra
Piero Scotti (1909–1976), Italian racing driver
Ranuccio Scotti Douglas (1597-1659), Bishop of Borgo San Donnino, Apostolic Nuncio to Switzerland and France
Roger Scotti (1925–2001), French football player
Tino Scotti (1905–1984), Italian actor
Tommaso Scotti (died 1556), Italian bishop of Terni 
Tony Scotti (born 1939), American actor and producer
Umberto Scotti (XIX century), one of the first players of Italian side A.C. Milan;
Vincenzo Scotti (born 1933), Italian politician and government minister
Vito Scotti (1918–1996), American actor